Lynette Zahira Ureña Díaz (born 27 June 2000) is a Dominican footballer who plays as a right back for American college Delaware State Hornets and the Dominican Republic national team.

International career
Ureña has appeared for the Dominican Republic at the 2020 CONCACAF Women's Olympic Qualifying Championship qualification.

References

External links

2000 births
Living people
Sportspeople from Santo Domingo
Dominican Republic women's footballers
Women's association football fullbacks
Briar Cliff University alumni
Delaware State Hornets women's soccer players
Women's Premier Soccer League players
Dominican Republic women's international footballers
Dominican Republic expatriate women's footballers
Dominican Republic expatriate sportspeople in the United States
Expatriate women's soccer players in the United States